David Thomas Anthony Kynaston (born 30 July 1951 in Aldershot) is an English historian specialising in the social history of England.

Early life and education
Kynaston was educated at Wellington College, Berkshire and New College, Oxford, from which he graduated with a Bachelor of Arts degree in modern history in 1973, and was awarded a PhD from the London School of Economics on the history of the London Stock Exchange in 1983.

Career and research
Kynaston became a Visiting Professor at Kingston University in 2001.

Tales of a New Jerusalem

In 2007 Kynaston published Austerity Britain, 1945–1951 to much acclaim. The title consists of two books that together make the first volume in a projected series of six entitled Tales of a New Jerusalem. In this series Kynaston intends to chronicle the history of Great Britain from the end of World War II to the ascension of Margaret Thatcher in 1979. Austerity Britain was named "Book of the Decade" by The Sunday Times.

Family Britain (2010) is the second volume in the series, and was also released as two books. It covers the period from 1951 to the Suez crisis of 1956. The volume was serialised on BBC Radio 4 as its Book of the Week for 23 November 2009, read by Dominic West. The third volume, Modernity Britain, covering the years 1957–59, was published in June 2013.

Publications
 King Labour: British Working Class, 1850–1914, 1976
 Bobby Abel: Professional Batsman, 1857–1936, 1982
 Archie's Last Stand: M.C.C. in New Zealand 1922-23: Being an Account of Mr. A. C. MacLaren's tour and His Last Stand, 1984
 The Financial Times: a centenary history, 1988
 WG's Birthday Party, 1990
 Cazenove & Co.: a history, 1991
 The Bank of England: Money, Power, and Influence 1694–1994, 1995 (edited by Richard Roberts)
 The City of London, Volume I: A World of Its Own, 1815–90, 1995
 The City of London, Volume II: Golden Years, 1890–1914, 1995
 LIFFE: A Market and its Makers, 1997
 The City of London, Volume III: Illusions of Gold, 1914–45, 1999
 The City of London, Volume IV: Club No More, 1945–2000, 2002 (with Will Sulkin)
 Austerity Britain, 1945–51, 2007, reprinted as:
 Austerity Britain: A World to Build, 1945–48, 2008
 Austerity Britain: Smoke in the Valley, 1948–51, 2008
 Family Britain, 1951–57, 2009
 City of London: The History, 2012
 Modernity Britain, 1957–62, 2014, previously published as:
 Modernity Britain: Opening the Box, 1957–59, 2013
 Modernity Britain: A Shake of the Dice, 1959–62, 2014
 Till Time's Last Sand: A History of the Bank of England 1694–2013, 2017
 Arlott, Swanton and the Soul of English Cricket, 2018 (with Stephen Fay) 
 Engines of Privilege: Britain's private school problem, co-authored with Francis Green
 On the Cusp: Days of '62, 2021

References

1951 births
Living people
Alumni of New College, Oxford
Alumni of the London School of Economics
English historians
English male journalists
English political writers
English financial writers
Fellows of the Royal Society of Literature
British social scientists
Economic historians
British social commentators
Cricket historians and writers